This is a list of governors of Vorarlberg, a state in Austria.

List of officeholders 

List
Vorarlberg